Gloria Mundi is a 2019 French drama film directed by Robert Guédiguian. It was selected to compete for the Golden Lion at the 76th Venice International Film Festival. At the Venice Film Festival, Ariane Ascaride won the Volpi Cup for Best Actress.

Cast
 Ariane Ascaride as Sylvie
 Jean-Pierre Darroussin as Richard
 Gérard Meylan as Daniel
 Anaïs Demoustier as Mathilda

References

External links
 

2019 films
2019 drama films
French drama films
2010s French-language films
Films directed by Robert Guédiguian
2010s French films